Cretaquarium (Enidrio Kritis) or Thalassocosmos ("sea world") is a public aquarium located near the town of Gournes in Crete, Greece, 15 km east of the city of Heraklion.

History
The Cretaquarium project was conceived by employees of the former Institute of Marine Biology of Crete (IMBC) to create the first large aquarium in Greece, as part of a marine park for research, education, culture and recreation. Its construction was co-financed by the European Investment Bank and the Greek state. Cretaquarium first opened on the site of the former USAF Iraklion Air Station near the town of Gournes in December 2005 and underwent  a major expansion during the winter of 2008–9, when 25 new tanks were installed.

The aquarium is currently operated by the Hellenic Centre for Marine Research, a public research institution. Its exhibits focus on the marine fauna of the Mediterranean region and include sea organisms from over 250 species in more than 60 tanks.

Gallery

See also
Natural History Museum of Crete

References

External links

Museums in Crete
Buildings and structures in Heraklion (regional unit)
Aquaria in Greece